The Standing Committee on Finance is a standing committee in the National Assembly of the Parliament of South Africa.

Mandate
The committee oversees the National Treasury and statutory entities, including the Accounting Standards Board, the Co-operative Banks Development Agency, the Development Bank of Southern Africa (DBSA), the Office of the Ombud for Financial Services Providers, the Financial Intelligence Centre (FIC), the Financial and Fiscal Commission, the Financial Sector Conduct Authority, the Government Pensions Administration Agency (GPAA), the Government Technical Advisory Centre, the Independent Regulatory Board for Auditors (IRBA), the Land and Agricultural Development Bank of South Africa, the Office of the Pension Funds Adjudicator, the Public Investment Corporation (PIC), the South African Special Risk Insurance Association (SASRIA), the South African Revenue Service (SARS), the South African Reserve Bank (SARB) and the Office of the Tax Ombud.

Membership
Members elected in the general election that was held on 8 May 2019, were appointed on 27 June. Joe Maswanganyi of the African National Congress was elected chair of the committee on 2 July. The committee's members are as follows:

The following people serve as alternate members:

See also
Committees of the Parliament of South Africa

References

External links
Standing Committee on Finance – People's Assembly

Committees of the National Assembly of South Africa